Nationality words link to articles with information on the nation's poetry or literature (for instance, Irish or France).

Events
c. May 22 – The Brontë sisters' first published work, the collection Poems by Currer, Ellis, and Acton Bell, is issued in London. It sells just two copies in the first year.
 September 12 – Elizabeth Barrett and Robert Browning marry privately in St Marylebone Parish Church, London, departing for the continent a week later.

Works published in English

United Kingdom

 William Barnes, Poems, Partly of Rural Life
 Robert Bell, ed., Ancient Poems, Ballads and Songs of the Peasantry of England
 Charlotte Brontë, Emily Brontë, and Anne Brontë, Poems by Currer, Ellis and Acton Bell
 Robert Browning, Luria: a Tragedy; a Soul's Tragedy, volume 8 of Bells and Pomegranates (see also Bells and Pomegranates 1841, 1842, 1843, 1844, and 1845)
 John Burgon, Petra: a poem, to which a few short poems are now added
 Henry Cary, Lives of English Poets, from Johnson to Kirke White, verse first published in the London Magazine from 1821 to 1824
 Thomas Hood, Poems
 John Keble, Lyra Innocentium: Thoughts in verse on Christian children
 Edward Lear, writing under the pen name "Derry Down Derry", A Book of Nonsense, also illustrated by Lear; expanded in 1855, 1861, 1863 etc. (See also, Nonsense Songs 1870, dated 1871, More Nonsense 1872, Laughable Lyrics 1877
 Carolina, Lady Nairne (died 1845), Lays from Strathern, Scottish

United States
 Oliver Wendell Holmes:
 Urania: A Rhymed Lesson
 Poems
 Elijah Kellogg, Spartacus to the Gladiators
 Henry Morford, The Rest of Don Juan
 John Godfrey Saxe, Progress: A Satirical Poem
 William Gilmore Simms, Areytos, or Songs of the South
 John Greenleaf Whittier, Voices of Freedom

Works published in other languages
 Aleardo Aleardi, Lettere a Maria ("Letters to Mary"), Italy
 Gottfried Keller, Gedichte

Births
Death years link to the corresponding "[year] in poetry" article:
 April 4 – Comte de Lautréamont, pen name of Isidore Lucien Ducasse (died 1870), French
 April 24 – Marcus Clarke (died 1881), Australian novelist and poet
 May 25 – Naim Frashëri (died 1900), Albanian
 August 17 – Alexander MacGregor Rose (died 1898), Scottish-born Canadian
 August 28 – G. H. Gibson, "Ironbark" (died 1921), Australian
 September 26 – Mary Hannay Foott (died 1918), Australian
 October 9 – Holger Drachmann (died 1908), Danish
 October 27 – Katherine Harris Bradley, half of "Michael Field" (died 1914), English

Deaths
Birth years link to the corresponding "[year] in poetry" article:
 January 7 – John Hookham Frere (born 1769), English
 February 14 (probable date) – Standish O'Grady (born before 1793), Irish-Canadian poet and priest
 April 11 – Barron Field (born 1786), Anglo-Australian
 May 14 – Sarah Wentworth Apthorp Morton (born 1759), American
 November 23 – George Darley (born 1795), Irish-born

See also

 19th century in poetry
 19th century in literature
 List of years in poetry
 List of years in literature
 Victorian literature
 French literature of the 19th century
 Biedermeier era of German literature
 Golden Age of Russian Poetry (1800–1850)
 Young Germany (Junges Deutschland) a loose group of German writers from about 1830 to 1850
 List of poets
 Poetry
 List of poetry awards

Notes

19th-century poetry
Poetry